The Ethiopian snake-eyed skink (Panaspis tancredii), also known commonly as Boulenger's dwarf skink, is a species of lidless skink, a lizard in the family Scincidae. The species is endemic to Ethiopia.

Etymology
The specific name, tancredii, is in honor of Italian explorer Alfonso Maria Tancredi (died 1942).

Habitat

Reproduction
The mode of reproduction of P. tancredii is unknown.

References

Further reading
Boulenger GA (1909). "On the Reptiles and Batrachians collected by the Tancredi Expedition to Lake Tsana, Abyssinia". Annali del Museo Civico di Storia Naturale di Genova, Serie Terza 4: 193. (Ablepharus tancredii, new species).
Largen MJ, Spawls S (2010). Amphibians and Reptiles of Ethiopia and Eritrea. Frankfurt am Main: Edition Chimaira / Serpents Tale. 694 pp. . (Panaspis tancredi, p. 407).

Panaspis
Reptiles described in 1909
Reptiles of Ethiopia
Endemic fauna of Ethiopia
Taxa named by George Albert Boulenger